The 1924 Oregon Agricultural Aggies football team represented Oregon Agricultural College (now known as Oregon State University) in the Pacific Coast Conference (PCC) during the 1924 college football season.  In their first season under head coach Paul J. Schissler, the Beavers compiled a 3–5 record (1–4 against PCC opponents), finished in seventh place in the PCC, and were outscored by their opponents, 85 to 71. Millard Scott was the team captain, and Percy Locey became the first Oregon Agricultural player to appear in an East–West Shrine Game. The team played its home games at Bell Field in Corvallis, Oregon.

In the early months of 1924, the college considered applications from 90 candidates for the position as the head football coach. On April 1, 1924, Paul Schissler was hired for the post. He had previously served as the head football coach at Lombard College in Galesburg, Illinois, had lost only one game (to Notre Dame) and outscored opponents 800 to 69 in three years at Lombard, and had been recommended to Oregon Agricultural by Knute Rockne.

Schedule

References

Oregon Agricultural
Oregon State Beavers football seasons
Oregon Agricultural Aggies football